The RTA clade is a clade of araneomorph spiders, united by the possession of a retrolateral tibial apophysis – a backward-facing projection on the tibia of the male pedipalp. The clade contains over 21,000 species, almost half the current total of about 46,000 known species of spider. Most of the members of the clade are wanderers and do not build webs. Despite making up approximately half of all modern spider diversity, there are no unambiguous records of the group from the Mesozoic and molecular clock evidence suggests that the group began to diversify during the Late Cretaceous.

Families
In 2005, Coddington included 39 families in a cladogram showing the RTA clade:

Agelenidae
Amaurobiidae
Ammoxenidae
Amphinectidae (paraphyletic; merged into Desidae)
Anyphaenidae
Cithaeronidae
Clubionidae
Corinnidae
Cryptothelidae
Ctenidae
Desidae
Dictynidae
Gallieniellidae
Gnaphosidae
Lamponidae
Liocranidae
Lycosidae
Miturgidae (paraphyletic)
Oxyopidae
Philodromidae
Phyxelididae
Pisauridae
Psechridae
Salticidae
Selenopidae
Senoculidae
Sparassidae
Stiphidiidae
Tengellidae (now merged into Zoropsidae)
Thomisidae
Titanoecidae
Trechaleidae
Trochanteriidae
Zodariidae
Zoridae (now a synonym of Miturgidae)
Zorocratidae (no longer accepted; most genera now placed in Udubidae)
Zoropsidae

References

Araneomorphae